Ahmad "Babyface" Kaddour (born January 1, 1982, Lebanon) is a professional boxer.

Personal life
Born in Tripoli, Lebanon, Kaddour's parents fled the 1982 Lebanon War and Ahmad grew up in Denmark where he got his start in boxing. He has moved back and forth between Europe and the United States since 2003.

Professional boxing career

The beginning
After winning the Danish National Amateur Championship in 2000, and his 2nd Nordic Amateur Championship (1999 and 2000), and much international amateur experience (Dual in England, Finland, Dual in Sweden, Home dual v Sweden, Germany), Kaddour turned pro. Kaddour started his career in Europe, fighting in Denmark, Wales, Hungary, Finland, Italy and Germany including a fight against Alessio Furlan at Braunschweig, Germany. The fight went the full distance with Kaddour winning narrowly on points to inflict Furlan with the first defeat of his professional career. Soon after Kaddour moved to the United States to further his career.

USA and The Contender Series
In 2003–2004, Kaddour fought 4 out of 5 fights in the USA, the other in Germany, against opponents with winning records and won 3 of the 4 USA fights by stoppage, and was very confident at 18-0 when selected to participate on the reality TV show The Contender, broadcast worldwide, and was placed on the East Coast team. While on the team, he got involved in a feud with Ishe Smith early on and they fought in the 3rd match. At the time Smith was world ranked by all 4 sanctioning organizations and held the USBA, the NABO, and the WBC Continental Americas titles. Kaddour gunned for an early KO but Smith weathered the storm and won by unanimous decision, calling it a "tough fight" afterwards. Kaddour was voted back into the quarterfinals after Juan de la Rosa pulled out – a tactic by Jesse Brinkley, Anthony Bonsante, Peter Manfredo, and Joey Gilbert designed to get under Smith's skin. The week after Smith lost a split decision to eventual Contender and WBC champion Sergio Mora, Ahmad was matched with Alfonso Gomez  (who went on after the show to challenge for the WBA 147 lb and WBC 154 lb titles) by the same boxers who brought Kaddour back, with the hope that the two tough fighters would battle hard and the winner would be less ready for the semi-finals.  Kaddour lost by 1 round on 1 card and 3 rounds on the other 2 cards.

The first of the Contender contestants to fight again after the show's finale, Kaddour dominated through an 8-round unanimous decision against Maxell Taylor on July 22, 2005, on Showtime's Shobox.
Months later he fought Jesus Felipe Valverde to a draw due to a recurring stamina problem. Two of the judges scored the fight even and the third had Kaddour winning by two rounds. Two months after this, in November 2006, Ahmad had a rematch against Valverde, which he won by split decision on Versus. Valverde, who had gone the distance with future world titlists Carlos Quintana, Kermit Cintrón, and Yuri Foreman, as well as other top competition, was the busier fighter, but Kaddour was the more effective puncher. 

Ahmad's fiancé on the Contender series was Brandy Collins, an American who sponsored him for a fiancé visa. They were married after the Contender and had a son in 2006. Brandy later told him to leave their home in Houston. According to BoxingScene.com and a Houston Tribune article, Ahmad entered the home (still registered in both their names) without her permission in June 2007 and was charged with burglary. He pleaded guilty to Class A Misdemeanor trespassing and was sentenced to 180 days in Harris County Jail in downtown Houston and Brandy withdrew her sponsorship of him with the INS, causing Kaddour to be transferred to immigration agents and deported to Denmark upon his release from federal custody in December 2007, and Collins obtained a divorce. Kaddour also reportedly had problems breathing through his nose and had surgery.

The Comeback

After an almost 3-year hiatus from boxing working a steady job, Kaddour appeared on the undercard of Danish Super middleweight Mikkel Kessler's defense of the WBA title at the Messecenter Herning, Denmark, September 12, 2009, winning a unanimous decision over the tough German, Mike Ermis. He returned to the United States and beat Jerome Ellis by unanimous decision on March 26, 2010, then back to Denmark, where on February 11, 2011, he beat Lee Noble on Denmark's TV2 "Fight Night". Kaddour trained with Greg Coverson at the "Detroit Boxing Jungle" before scoring a 5th-round TKO over Vance Garvey at the Motor City Casino on October 6. His next 3 fights were for Sauerland Events on Viasat's Nordic Fight Night series, with 2012 decisions over Britain's Gary Boulden and Max Maxwell and a September 2013 unanimous decision over Estonia's Aleksei Tsatiasvili.

Future Plans
In August 2012 World Boxing News spoke with both Ishe Smith and Alfonso Gomez about possible rematches with Kaddour, giving him the opportunity to avenge his only 2 losses. Smith ruled a rematch out in the immediate future as he was still trying to attain his first world title shot through Golden Boy Promotions (since won a majority decision over The Contender 2 bronze medalist Cornelius Bundrage for the IBF 154 lb title 2/23/13), but Gomez expressed interest and promised to "beat him worse this time". February 2013, Kaddour stated he holds no ill will toward Smith from their Contender days despite the taunting that led to their old rivalry, but he still very much wants a rematch with Smith. In August 2013, Smith said "Beating Ahmed was right up there" with his best fights before winning the IBF title.

Professional boxing record

|align="center" colspan=8|27 Wins (10 knockouts, 16 decisions), 2 Losses ( 2 by decision), 1 Draw 
|-
| align="center" style="border-style: none none solid solid; background: #e3e3e3"|Res.
| align="center" style="border-style: none none solid solid; background: #e3e3e3"|Opponent
| align="center" style="border-style: none none solid solid; background: #e3e3e3"|Opp Rec
| align="center" style="border-style: none none solid solid; background: #e3e3e3"|Type
| align="center" style="border-style: none none solid solid; background: #e3e3e3"|Rd
| align="center" style="border-style: none none solid solid; background: #e3e3e3"|Date
| align="center" style="border-style: none none solid solid; background: #e3e3e3"|Location
| align="center" style="border-style: none none solid solid; background: #e3e3e3"|Notes
|-align=center
|-align=center
| || align=left| Aleksei Tsatiasvili ||4-4
|  || 6 ||
|align=left| 
|align=left|
|-align=center
| || align=left| Max Maxwell ||16-11-3
| || 8||
|align=left| 
|align=left|
|-align=center
| || align=left| Gary Boulden || 6-3-2
| || 8 ||
|align=left| 
|align=left|
|-align=center
| || align=left| Vance Garvey ||8-34-6
| || 5 (8) ||
|align=left| 
|align=left|
|-align=center
| || align=left|Lee Noble || 12-16-2
| || 6 ||
|align=left| 
|align=left|
|-align=center
| || align=left|Jerome Ellis ||12-10-2
| || 8 ||
|align=left| 
|align=left|
|-align=center
| || align=left| Cagri Ermis ||6-7-2
| || 6 ||
|align=left| 
|align=left|
|-align=center
| || align=left|Jesus Felipe Valverde ||21-12-1
| || 8 ||
|align=left| 
|align=left|
|-align=center
|style="background: #B0C4DE"|||align=left|Jesus Felipe Valverde ||21-12
| || 8 ||
|align=left| 
|align=left|
|-align=center
| || align=left|Maxell Taylor || 12-1
| || 8 ||
|align=left| 
|align=left|
|-align=center
| || align=left| Alfonso Gomez || 11-2-1
| || 5 ||
|align=left| 
|align=left|
|-align=center
| || align=left| Ishe Smith ||14-0
| || 5  ||
|align=left|  
|align=left|
|-align=center
| || align=left|Fontaine Cabell || 22-4-1
| || 1 (10)||
|align=left| 
|align=left|
|-align=center
| || align=left|Juan Carlos Garcia || 7-2
| || 4 (8)||
|align=left| 
|align=left|
|-align=center
| || align=left|Lorant Szabo || 20-14
| || 6 ||
|align=left| 
|align=left|
|-align=center
| || align=left|Leo Edwards || 14-12-2
| || 1 (8)||
|align=left| 
|align=left|
|-align=center
| || align=left|Wilmer Mejia || 13-3-2
| || 8 ||
|align=left| 
|align=left|
|-align=center
| || align=left|Alban Mothie || 9-7-1
| || 6 ||
|align=left| 
|align=left|
|-align=center
| || align=left|Louis Mimoune || 14-16
| || 3 (6)||
|align=left| 
|align=left|
|-align=center
| || align=left|Cyril Terrones || 21-14-1 
| || 6 ||
|align=left| 
|align=left|
|-align=center
| || align=left|Francesco Cioffi || 9-23-8
| || 2 (6)||
|align=left| 
|align=left|
|-align=center
| || align=left|Alessio Furlan || 3-0-2
| || 6 ||
|align=left| 
|align=left|
|-align=center
| || align=left|Rachid Ouafi || 3-0
| || 2 (6)||
|align=left| 
|align=left|
|-align=center
| || align=left|Michel Ventura || 5-6-1
| || 6 ||
|align=left| 
|align=left|
|-align=center
| || align=left|Hamit Riahi || 8-21-1
| || 1 ||
|align=left| 
|align=left|
|-align=center
| || align=left|Florin Oanea || 4-11-3
| || 6 ||
|align=left| 
|align=left|
|-align=center
| || align=left|David White || 0-4-1
| || 4 ||
|align=left| 
|align=left|
|-align=center
| || align=left|Antonio Postigo || 2-7-1
| || 4 ||
|align=left| 
|align=left|
|-align=center
| || align=left|Abdelilah Benabbou || 0-0-1
| || 1 ||
|align=left| 
|align=left|
|-align=center
| || align=left|Attila Kiss || 0-2
| || 4 ||
|align=left| 
|align=left|
|-align=center

References

External links
 
Facebook profile
Interview with About.com

Sportspeople from Beirut
1982 births
The Contender (TV series) participants
Living people
Lebanese male boxers
Lebanese emigrants to Denmark
Danish male boxers
Middleweight boxers